KVFX (94.5 FM), also known as VFX, is a Top 40 (CHR) radio station broadcasting in the Logan- Salt Lake City-Ogden, Utah metropolitan area. It is owned by the Sun Valley Radio, Inc.  KVFX-FM also broadcasts via translator in Tremonton at 98.3 MHz. The Station has been branded "Utah's VFX".  The station's studios are in Logan and the main transmitter (for 94.5 FM) is in Newton with a booster on 94.5 FM in Tremonton.

History
The station was assigned the call letters KMXL on May 17, 1982. On May 16, 1984, the station changed its call sign to KVFM and on December 15, 1997 to the current KVFX.

KVFX began broadcasting in HD Radio in 2022.

Translators and booster

References

External links 
Official website

VFX
Contemporary hit radio stations in the United States
Radio stations established in 1974